The Information Technology Industry Council (ITI)  is a Washington, D.C.-based global trade association that represents companies from the information and communications technology (ICT) industry. As an advocacy organization, ITI works to influence policy issues aimed at encouraging innovation and promoting global competitiveness across the world.

Ars Technica has described the Information Technology Industry Council as "a lobbying group with a membership list that includes almost all the heavy-hitters of the tech world". 
ITI works to help shape policy pertaining to tax, trade, talent, security, access, and sustainability issues for its member companies through its three main divisions: Environment and Sustainability, Global Policy, and Government Relations. ITI further supports its members by organizing industry-wide consensus on policy issues and providing access to global markets.

Jason Oxman is the current President and Chief Executive Officer of ITI.

According to its website, it was founded in 1916 in Chicago as the "National Association of Office Appliance Manufacturers", renamed the "Office Equipment Manufacturers Institute" in 1929, and became the "Business Equipment Manufacturers Association" (BEMA) in 1961. In 1973, it became the "Computer and Business Equipment Manufacturers Association" (CBEMA), before receiving its current name in 1994.

Environment and Sustainability Division

ITI's Environment and Sustainability division focuses on energy efficiency, product stewardship and electronics recycling, product design and materials restrictions, climate change, and environmentally preferable purchasing.

Government Relations Division

ITI promotes the interface between its member companies and policymakers and thought leaders. In order to accomplish this, it facilitates meetings with key policy individuals at ITI, on Capitol Hill, and with the Administration.

ITI works to pinpoint annual policy priorities for the ICT industry. The association works to help shape policy development for corporate tax, global market access, health IT, intellectual property, STEM education and workforce policy and telecommunications.

Global Policy Division

ITI's Global Policy division works to maintain and promote market access for the ICT industry. ITI collaborates with the U.S. Trade Representative, U.S. Department of Commerce, U.S. Department of State, and U.S. embassies abroad to address expanding global market access. ITI also fosters strong relationships with domestic member company representatives and local industry associations to further its international trade policy priorities.

ITI's Global Policy division targets accessibility, technical standards, regulatory compliance, international trade policy, cybersecurity and China policy, as specific issue areas.

ITI sponsors the International Committee for Information Technology Standards (INCITS) and has provided funding for the Information Technology and Innovation Foundation (ITIF), a Washington, D.C.-based think tank.

Member companies 
ITI member companies include:
 
 Accenture
 Adobe Systems, Inc.
 AMD
 Akamai 
 Amazon
 Apple
 Autodesk
 Canon Inc.
 Cisco
 Cognizant
 Corning Inc.
 Crown Castle
 Dell
 Digital Reality
 Dropbox (service)
 eBay
 Equinix
 Ericsson
 Ernst & Young
 Fortinet
 Fujitsu
 Gigamon
 Google
 Grant Thornton
 Hewlett Packard Enterprise
 Honeywell
 HP Inc.
 IBM
 Intel
 Intuit
 Iron Mountain (company)
 Juniper Networks
 Keysight Technologies
 Lenovo
 Lexmark
 Logitech
 Mastercard
 Medtronic
 Meta Platforms
 Microsoft
 Motorola Solutions
 NCR Corporation
 NetApp
 Nielsen Holdings
 NortonLifeLock
 Oracle Corporation
 Palo Alto Networks
 Qualcomm
 Rapid7
 Red Hat
 Sabre Corporation
 Salesforce
 Samsung
 SAP SE
 Schneider Electric
 Seagate Technology
 ServiceNow
 Siemens
 SK Hynix
 Snap Inc.
 SoftBank
 SWIFT
 Synopsys
 Tata Consultancy Services
 Tenable, Inc.
 Teradata
 Texas Instruments
 Toshiba
 Toyota
 TSMC
 Twilio
 Twitter
 Verisign
 Visa
 VMware
 Xerox
 Yahoo!
 Zoom (software)
 ZT Systems

References

External links
 Information Technology Industry Council (main website)
 ITI Press

Technology trade associations
Information technology lobbying organizations